The Bire Kpatuos Game Reserve is a protected area in South Sudan, Africa. The   tropical forest habitat features key species of Bongo and Yellow-backed Duiker.

The reserve is close to the point of convergence for flora and fauna from Central and East Africa and has a " forgotten forest " as some conservators call it.

In addition to bongo antelopes, there is also habitat for badger bats, African golden cats, forest elephants and forest buffalos.

South Sudan is making great efforts and has received significant support from donors around the world, to preserve the wilderness and environment in the reserve despite a long civil war.

References

Game reserves of South Sudan